Aapticheilichthys is a monotypic genus of killifish from the family Poeciliidae, the sole member being Aapticheilichthys websteri. A. websteri was found by the American fish breeder Kent Webster after which the species was named. The type locality was Akaka Camp on the western coastal plain of Gabon.

References

Endemic fauna of Gabon
Poeciliidae
Monotypic fish genera